Oussama Chita (born 31 October 1996) is an Algerian footballer who plays for USM Alger in the Algerian Ligue Professionnelle 1 and the Algeria national team. He plays primarily as a central midfielder.

Career
A product of the MC Alger youth ranks, Chita made his senior debut for the club in March 2014 as a 17-year-old, coming as a second-half substitute in a 1–0 league win over ASO Chlef.

International
He made his debut for his country on 18 November 2018 in an Africa Cup of Nations qualifier against Togo, as a starter.

Career statistics

Club

Honours

Club
 MC Alger
 Algerian Cup (2): 2014, 2016
 Algerian Super Cup (1): 2014

 USM Alger
 Algerian Ligue Professionnelle 1 (1): 2018–19

References

External links
 
 

1996 births
Algeria under-23 international footballers
Algeria international footballers
Algerian footballers
Association football midfielders
Algerian Ligue Professionnelle 1 players
MC Alger players
People from Aïn Defla Province
Living people
2015 Africa U-23 Cup of Nations players
USM Alger players
21st-century Algerian people
2022 African Nations Championship players
Algeria A' international footballers